× Elecalthusa is an intergeneric hybrid of orchids (family Orchidaceae). Its parents' genera are Arethusa, Calopogon and Eleorchis. Its abbreviation is Ecth.

References 

Arethusinae
Orchid nothogenera